Willard Dwight Miller (June 5, 1877 – February 19, 1959) was a United States Navy sailor and a recipient of America's highest military decoration—the Medal of Honor—for his actions in the Spanish–American War.

Biography

Willard Miller was born in Maitland, Nova Scotia on June 5, 1877. He enlisted in the U.S. Navy from the state of Massachusetts and served during the Spanish–American War as a crew member of the gunboat . On May 11, 1898, he took part in a small boat operation that cut the underwater telegraph cable off Cienfuegos, Cuba, and received the Medal of Honor for his conduct during the action (the Battle of Cienfuegos).

Miller's younger brother, Harry Herbert Miller, was also awarded the Medal of Honor for the same action, making the two men one of only eight pairs of brothers to be awarded the medal.

Miller left the Navy in 1906 and later served in the U.S. Lighthouse Service.

He died on February 19, 1959, at age 81 and is buried in Arlington National Cemetery, Arlington County, Virginia. His grave can be found in Section 46, Lot 15.

Medal of Honor citation
Seaman Miller's official Medal of Honor citation reads:
On board the U.S.S. Nashville during the operation of cutting the cable leading from Cienfuegos, Cuba, May 11, 1898. Facing the heavy fire of the enemy, Miller displayed extraordinary bravery and coolness throughout this action.

See also

 List of Medal of Honor recipients
 List of Medal of Honor recipients for the Spanish–American War

Notes

References

 

1877 births
1959 deaths
American military personnel of the Spanish–American War
Burials at Arlington National Cemetery
Canadian emigrants to the United States
Canadian people of British descent
United States Navy Medal of Honor recipients
People from Hants County, Nova Scotia
United States Navy sailors
Canadian-born Medal of Honor recipients
Spanish–American War recipients of the Medal of Honor
United States Lighthouse Service personnel